The Ministry of Community Empowerment and Advancement (Ha-Misrad LeHizuk V'Kidum Kehilati) of the government of Israel, is the governmental department responsible for Communal Development in the State of Israel.

History
The Ministry was established in May 2020 during the negotiations to form a new government after the election to Knesset.
The Ministry oversees the work of  the Anti-Violence and Anti-Drug Authority, the National Child Protection Network, a City Without Violence project and various projects to strengthen the Arab sector. Its political head is the Community Empowerment and Advancement Minister of Israel, and its offices are located in Jerusalem.

List of ministers

References

External links

 

Israel
Israel
 Government ministries of Israel